Canon City, California is a ghost town in Trinity County, California.

History
The town was populated circa 1851–1891.  It had a post office from 1856 to 1857. In 1857, a road was completed from Canon City to Weaverville.

A historical marker is all that remains of the former town.

See also
List of ghost towns in California

References

Former populated places in Trinity County, California